Birgit Engl (born 4 March 1979) is an Austrian handball player. She competed in the women's tournament at the 2000 Summer Olympics.

References

1979 births
Living people
Austrian female handball players
Olympic handball players of Austria
Handball players at the 2000 Summer Olympics
People from Grieskirchen District
Sportspeople from Upper Austria